Podole may refer to:
Podolia, a region in Ukraine
Podole, Aleksandrów County in Kuyavian-Pomeranian Voivodeship (north-central Poland)
Podole, Lipno County in Kuyavian-Pomeranian Voivodeship (north-central Poland)
Podole, Rypin County in Kuyavian-Pomeranian Voivodeship (north-central Poland)
Podole, Lublin Voivodeship (east Poland)
Podole, Łódź Voivodeship (central Poland)
Podole, Lesser Poland Voivodeship (south Poland)
Podole, Subcarpathian Voivodeship (south-east Poland)
Podole, Świętokrzyskie Voivodeship (south-central Poland)
Podole, Masovian Voivodeship (east-central Poland)